Tuipui may refer to:

 Kaladan River, a river on India-Myanmar border
 Tuipui, Champhai, a village in Mizoram, India